Purple City Productions is a Harlem-based rap crew. The original members include Shiest Bub, Agallah,  Un Kasa & E-Norm. In more recent years the roster has extended to include artists such as Smoke DZA, A-Mafia, Topher, Ben Bostaph, Streets da Block, Den10, Tommy Tsunami, Smoke & Numbers, OMC, Lyrical Stress and Doe Boy Choch.

History
Purple City, also known as PCP or Purple City Productions, is closely affiliated with other Harlem-based artists such as The Diplomats. Purple City began in 2001 when Shiest Bub met Cam'Ron of The Diplomats at a shoe store. After exchanging numbers and weed, a connection was made. Shiest had the Purple, and soon enough Shiest was running around with Dip Set and Purple City was born. Cam'Ron served as mentors to Shiest, leading him to create Purple City and began to put out mixtapes. To date, Purple City has released eight mixtapes, selling an estimated 11,234 copies, and launching the career of E-Norm. Purple City has also commercially released three albums, Paris to Purple City, The Purple Album, and Road to the Riches: The Best of the Purple City Mixtapes.

Former members
Un Kasa
Agallah
E-Norm
Smoke DZA 
Mike Boogie

Discography

Albums
 Purple City Matrix (July 22, 2003)
 Road to the Riches: The Best of the Purple City Mixtapes (March 22, 2005)
 Paris to Purple City (November 8, 2005)
 The Purple Album (May 23, 2006)
 Born to The Purple DVD (With Bonus Swagger Development Mixtape (May 23, 2006)
 International Bud Dealer 2009

Mixtapes
 Gladiator (Hosted by Cormega  (July 09, 2003)
 The Incredible Piff
 The Purple City Family in Candyland
 Shiest Bub-z Presents: The Color Purple
 Shiest Bub-z Presents: Summer Grind
 Shiest Bub-z & DJ Mo Sticky Presents: Bubble Music
 Shiest Bub-z Presents The Matrix 2: Vol. 4 Reloaded Hosted by. Juelz Santana
 Shiest Bub-z Presents The Price Is Right
 Shiest Bub-z Presents The Need for Weed
 Shiest Bub-z Presents: Every Daze My Birthday
 Shiest Bub-z The Matrix Hosted by Cam'ron

References

External links
 

Hip hop collectives
American hip hop groups